Betty Tompkins (born 1945) is an American artist and arts educator. Her paintings revolve, almost exclusively, around photorealistic, close-up imagery of both heterosexual and homosexual intimate acts. She creates large-scale, monochromatic canvases and works on paper of singular or multiple figures engaged in sexual acts, executed with successive layers of spray painting over pre-drawings formed by text.

Alongside artists such as Carolee Schneemann, Yoko Ono, Valie Export, Joan Semmel, Lynda Benglis and Judy Chicago, Tompkins has been re-assessed as a pioneer of Feminist art. She is listed in The Brooklyn Museum's Elizabeth A. Sackler Center for Feminist Art's Feminist Art Base.

Early life and education
Tompkins was born in 1945 in Washington, D.C. and grew up in Philadelphia, Pennsylvania.

She received her B.F.A. degree from Syracuse University in the 1960s. She took a teaching job at Central Washington State College in Ellensburg, Washington shortly after marrying her first husband, Don Tompkins, who was one of her instructors at Syracuse University. She completed her graduate degree at Central Washington State College, traveling between Ellensburg and New York City.

Career 
At the time of their marriage, Don Tompkins had a collection of pornography had ordered from Asia in order to avoid US obscenity laws in the 1950s. These images influenced Betty's first body of work, Fuck Paintings.

In 2002, Jerry Saltz shared an image of one of Tompkins' Fuck Paintings with gallery owner Michell Algus, who offered her a solo exhibition in his New York City gallery. It was Tompkins first solo exhibition in almost 15 years, and helped restart her art career. She was invited to the 7th Biennale d'Art Contemporain de Lyon in 2003, and a year later the Centre Pompidou purchased one of her works for their permanent collection.

In 2019, Tompkins had her Instagram account deleted after she posted a photo of her Fuck Painting #1. A few months later in 2019, Instagram held a closed meeting to discuss censorship, art, and nudity on their software platform. Some artists joined the meeting, including Micol Hebron, Marilyn Minter, Joanne Leah, and Siddhant Talwar. Tompkins was unable to attend the meeting but shared a written statement.

In 2018, she was the recipient of an Anonymous Was a Woman Award.

Work

Fuck Paintings (1969–1974, 2003–present)
Tompkins first major body of work was a series of paintings depicting a male and female figure engaging in sexual intercourse. She elected to render the images in extreme close-up, using vintage pornography stills as her source material. Rather than idealizing the act of fornication by having one body or the other exude dominance or beauty above the other, she equalizes the figures by showing only their genitalia, in congress. The works were produced using hundreds of layers of spray paint, using a finely-calibrated airbrush to build from underdrawing to final image. These early works were made solely with black and white pigments, with extremely high contrasting tonality.

Since returning to the series in 2003, Tompkins uses a base color combination to produce a more illuminated monochrome. She originally gave the series the more modest name Joined Forms, then later called the series Fuck Paintings. Within this first series, until 1976, Tompkins produced a sub-set of works entitled Cow Cunt Paintings.

Censored Grids (1974–present)

In 1974, Tompkins was scheduled to show her work in Paris. When her art arrived, French customs officials seized it, declaring it obscene and unfit for public exhibition. It took Tompkins nearly a year to arrange its return, at great financial and emotional cost to her. In response to the ordeal, Tompkins began making paintings in the form of grids, where a set of white blocks with the word "censored" at the center blocked out all traces of genitalia or primary imagery in the composition. Tompkins said she would continue to make these paintings, as there was seemingly no end to government censorship of visual art.

WOMEN Words (2002 and 2013)

In 2002 and 2013, Tompkins circulated the following email: “I am considering doing another series of pieces using images of women  words.  I would appreciate your help in developing the vocabulary.  Please send me a list of words that describe women.  They can be affectionate (honey), pejorative (bitch), slang, descriptive, etc. The words don’t have to be in English but I need as accurate a translation as possible. Many, many thanks, Betty Tompkins.”  Over 3,500 words and phrases were submitted in seven languages, equally split between men and women. In 2012, Tompkins was invited to create a performance in Vienna where 500 of the words and phrases were read aloud. Inspired by that performance, the artist then set out to create 1,000 individual word paintings, intending the series to be presented en masse once complete. On January 1, 2013, Tompkins created the first painting SLUT (#1). In an interview with Art in America, Tompkins says, "People sent stories, too. They made comments. It was very personal. But the same four words were the most popular. Actually nothing has changed."

Public museum collections
Tompkins work is held in many public museum collections, including:

Fuck Painting #1 (1969), Centre Georges Pompidou, Paris, France
Ayrshire Class D (1979), Allen Memorial Art Museum, Oberlin, Ohio, United States
Oberlin College, (Oberlin, Ohio)
Paterson Museum, (Paterson, New Jersey)
Museum of the City of New York, (New York City)
Southern Alleghenies Museum of Art, (Pennsylvania)
Stamford Museum & Nature Center, (Stamford, Connecticut)

Exhibitions
Tompkins work has been in many exhibitions, this is a select list:

References

External links
Official website

1945 births
Living people
American women painters
Painters from Washington, D.C.
Syracuse University alumni
Artists from Philadelphia
Painters from Pennsylvania
Central Washington University faculty
20th-century American painters
20th-century American women artists
21st-century American painters
21st-century American women artists
Artists from Washington, D.C.
American women academics